Torsås Municipality (Torsås kommun, Torsås meaning "Thor's ridge") is the southernmost municipality of Kalmar County, Sweden. Its seat is located in the town Torsås.

The present municipality was created in 1971, when "old" Torsås was merged with Söderåkra.

Geography 
The geography consists mainly of forest, not uncommon in Småland province. Located by the Baltic Sea, it has been somewhat cultivated too and there are some plains.

Being sparsely populated, Torsås Municipality tries to attract people to settle there, boasting its nature and the advantages of a small municipality while being no more than 30 minutes away from the larger towns of Kalmar and Karlskrona.

Localities
There are 3 urban areas (tätorter), localities, in Torsås Municipality.

In the table the localities are listed according to the size of the population as of December 31, 2005. The municipal seat is in bold characters.

A part of the locality Brömsebro is also in the municipality.

Attractions 

Points of interest in Torsås include a monument honouring the Treaty of Brömsebro between Denmark and Sweden in 1645, and the Garpen lighthouse, located on a small islet off the coast, where one can spend the night at a hostel.

References
Statistics Sweden

External links

Torsås Municipality - Official site

Municipalities of Kalmar County
1971 establishments in Sweden